Valentin Marian Negru (born 4 September 1982) is a Romanian former footballer who plays as a midfielder for teams such as Sportul Studențesc, Rapid București, Unirea Urziceni, CS Otopeni or Petrolul Ploiești, among others.

Honours

Sportul Studențesc
Liga II: 2000–01

Rapid București
Cupa României: 2005–06

External links
 
 
 

1982 births
Living people
Footballers from Bucharest
Romanian footballers
Association football midfielders
Liga I players
Liga II players
FC Sportul Studențesc București players
FC Rapid București players
FC Unirea Urziceni players
CS Otopeni players
FC Politehnica Iași (1945) players
CS Brănești players
FC Petrolul Ploiești players
CS Gaz Metan Mediaș players
Romanian football managers
FC Rapid București assistant managers